Route 171 is a north/south highway on the south shore of the St. Lawrence River in Quebec, Canada. Its southern terminus is in Scott at the junction of Route 173 and its northern terminus is in Lévis at the junction of Route 132. Route 171 follows the Chaudière River for most of its course, from the former town of Saint-Étienne-de-Lauzon up to Scott.

Since it parallels Autoroute 73, and as it is located on the western side of the Chaudiere (whereas most town centres are located on the eastern side), Route 171 is far from being a busy highway.

Municipalities along Route 171

 Scott
 Saint-Bernard
 Saint-Lambert-de-Lauzon
 Lévis - (Saint-Nicolas / Saint-Etienne-de-Lauzon)

See also
 List of Quebec provincial highways

References

External links 
 Provincial Route Map (Courtesy of the Quebec Ministry of Transportation) 
 Route 171 on Google Maps

171
Transport in Lévis, Quebec